Tom Okker was the defending champion, but lost in the quarterfinals this year.

Harold Solomon won the tournament, beating Shlomo Glickstein in the final, 6–2, 6–3.

Seeds

  Harold Solomon (champion)
  Shlomo Glickstein (final)
  Ilie Năstase (semifinals)
  Stefan Simonsson (first round)
  Klaus Eberhard (first round)
  Steve Krulevitz (second round)
  Per Hjertquist (quarterfinals)
  Onny Parun (quarterfinals)

Draw

Finals

Top half

Bottom half

External links
 Main draw

Tel Aviv Open
1980 Grand Prix (tennis)